Domitien Ndihokubwayo (born October 4, 1966 in Ngozi Province) is a Burundian politician CNDD-FDD who has been serving as the Minister of Finance in the governments of Prime Minister Alain-Guillaume Bunyoni since May 2016. He succeeded Tabu Abdallah.

Career
Prior to this appointment, Ndihokubwayo was in charge of the Burundi Revenue Authority (OBR).

In his capacity as minister, Ndihokubwayo has been serving as chair of the International Monetary Fund's African Caucus since 2021.

Other activities
 African Development Bank (AfDB), Ex-Officio Member of the Board of Governors (since 2016)

References

Living people
1966 births
National Council for the Defense of Democracy – Forces for the Defense of Democracy politicians
Government ministers of Burundi
Finance ministers
Sotho people
People from Ngozi Province